Leon Braslin (born 12 May 1938) is an Australian former cricketer. He played one first-class match for Tasmania in 1961/62.

See also
 List of Tasmanian representative cricketers

References

External links
 

1938 births
Living people
Australian cricketers
Tasmania cricketers
Cricketers from Tasmania